The Beechcraft Bonanza is an American general aviation aircraft introduced in 1947 by Beech Aircraft Corporation of Wichita, Kansas. The six-seater, single-engined aircraft is still being produced by Beechcraft and has been in continuous production longer than any other aircraft in history. More than 17,000 Bonanzas of all variants have been built, produced in both distinctive V-tail and conventional tail configurations; early conventional-tail versions were marketed as the Debonair.

Design and development

At the end of World War II, two all-metal light aircraft emerged, the Model 35 Bonanza and the Cessna 195, that represented very different approaches to the premium end of the postwar civil-aviation market. With its high-wing, seven-cylinder radial engine, fixed tailwheel undercarriage, and roll-down side windows, the Cessna 195 was a continuation of prewar technology. The Bonanza, however, featured an easier-to-manage, horizontally opposed, six-cylinder engine, retractable tricycle undercarriage (although the nosewheel initially was not steerable, but castering) and low-wing configuration.

Designed by a team led by Ralph Harmon, the model 35 Bonanza was a relatively fast, low-wing, all-aluminum design, at a time when most light aircraft were still made of wood and fabric. The Model 35 featured retractable landing gear, and its signature V-tail (equipped with combination elevator-rudders called "ruddervators"). The prototype 35 Bonanza made its first flight on December 22, 1945, with the type receiving an airworthiness certificate on March 25, 1947. Production began that year. The first 30–40 Bonanzas produced had fabric-covered flaps and ailerons, after which those surfaces were covered with magnesium alloy sheet.

The Bonanza family eventually comprised three major variants:
 Model 35 Bonanza (1947–1982; V-tail)
 Model 33 Debonair or Bonanza (1960–1995; conventional tail)
 Model 36 Bonanza (1968–present; a stretched Model 33)

The Model 33 Debonair was introduced in 1960 as a lower-priced model with more austere standard instrumentation, exterior equipment, paint schemes, and interior fabrics and trim than the more prestigious V-tail Bonanza. However, most Bonanza features were available as factory options on the Debonair, and by the mid 1960s, most Debonair buyers were ordering most or all of these options. Realizing this, Beechcraft dropped the Debonair name and most of the basic and seldom-ordered standard features with the introduction of the E33 in 1968.

Despite its name, the Twin Bonanza is a substantially wider and heavier aircraft that is mostly dissimilar to the single-engined Bonanza; the only major shared parts are the front fuselage sides, windows, and main cabin door. However, the Twin Bonanza had trouble competing with the similarly capable but substantially lighter Cessna 310 and Piper PA-23, so Beechcraft used the basic Bonanza fuselage and many other Bonanza parts to create the twin-engined Travel Air, which was later developed into the Baron.

Operational history 

The V-tail design gained a reputation as the "forked-tail doctor killer", due to crashes by overconfident wealthy amateur pilots, fatal accidents, and inflight breakups. "Doctor killer" has sometimes been used to describe the conventional-tailed version, as well. However, a detailed analysis by the Aircraft Owners and Pilots Association of accident records for common single-engine retractable-gear airplanes in the United States between 1982 and 1989 demonstrated that the Bonanza had a slightly lower accident rate than other types in the study. Pilot error was cited in 73% of V-tail crashes and 83% of conventional-tail crashes, with aircraft-related causes accounting for 15% and 11% of crashes respectively. However, the study noted that the aircraft had an unusually high incidence of gear-up landings and inadvertent landing gear retractions on the ground, which were attributed to a non-standard gear-retraction switch on early models that is easily confused with the switch that operates the flaps. Models starting in 1984 use a more distinctive relocated landing-gear switch, augmented by "squat switches" in the landing gear that prevent its operation while compressed by the aircraft's weight, and a throttle position switch that prevents gear retraction at low engine power settings.

In the late 1980s, repeated V-tail structural failures prompted the United States Department of Transportation and Federal Aviation Administration (FAA) to conduct extensive wind tunnel and flight tests, which proved that the V-tail did not meet type certification standards under certain conditions; the effort culminated with the issuance of an airworthiness directive to strengthen the tail, which significantly reduced the incidence of in-flight breakups. Despite this, Beech has long contended that most V-tail failures involve operations well beyond the aircraft's intended flight envelope.
Subsequent analysis of National Transportation Safety Board (NTSB) accident records between 1962 and 2007 revealed an average of three V-tail structural failures per year, while the conventional-tailed Bonanza 33 and 36 suffered only eleven such failures in total during the same 45 years. Most V-tail failures involved flight under visual flight rules into instrument meteorological conditions, flight into thunderstorms, or airframe icing.

In addition to the structural issues, the Bonanza 35 has a relatively narrow center of gravity envelope, and the tail design is intolerant of imbalances caused by damage, improper maintenance, or repainting. Such imbalances may induce dangerous aeroelastic flutter. Despite these issues, many Bonanza 35 owners insist that the aircraft is reasonably safe and its reputation has resulted in reduced purchase costs for budget-conscious buyers.

In 1982, the production of the V-tail Bonanza stopped but the conventional-tail Model 33 continued in production until 1995. Still built today is the Model 36 Bonanza, a longer-bodied, straight-tail variant of the original design, introduced in 1968. No Bonanzas were delivered in 2021, but on April 10, 2022, it was announced that production of the Bonanza G36 had restarted.

In January 2012, the Australian Civil Aviation Safety Authority issued an airworthiness directive grounding all Bonanzas, Twin Bonanzas, and Debonairs equipped with a single pole-style yoke and that have forward elevator control cables that are more than 15 years old until they could be inspected. The AD was issued based on two aircraft found to have frayed cables, one of which suffered a cable failure just prior to takeoff and resulting concerns about the age of the cables in fleet aircraft of this age. At the time of the grounding, some Bonanzas had reached 64 years in service. Aircraft with frayed cables were grounded until the cables were replaced and those that passed inspection were required to have their cables replaced within 60 days regardless. The AD affected only Australian aircraft and was not adopted by the airworthiness authority responsible for the type certificate, the US Federal Aviation Administration. The FAA instead opted to issue a Special Airworthiness Information Bulletin requesting that the elevator control cables be inspected during the annual inspection.

QU-22 Pave Eagle
The QU-22 was a Beech 36/A36 Bonanza modified during the Vietnam War to be an electronic monitoring signal relay aircraft, developed under the project name "Pave Eagle" for the United States Air Force. An AiResearch turbocharged, reduction-geared Continental GTSIO-520-G engine was used to reduce its noise signature, much like the later Army-Lockheed YO-3A. These aircraft were intended to be used as unmanned drones to monitor seismic and acoustic sensors dropped along the Ho Chi Minh Trail in Laos and report troop and supply movements. When the project was put into operation in 1968, however, the aircraft were all flown by pilots of the 554th Reconnaissance Squadron Detachment 1, call sign "Vampire". A separate operation "Compass Flag" monitored the General Directorate of Rear Services along the Ho Chi Minh Trail linking to the 6908th security squadron.

Six YQU-22A prototypes (modifications of the Beech 33 Debonair) were combat-tested in 1968, and two were lost during operations, with a civilian test pilot killed. Twenty-seven QU-22Bs were modified, 13 in 1969 and 14 in 1970, with six lost in combat. Two Air Force pilots were killed in action. All of the losses were due to engine failures or effects of turbulence. A large cowl bump above the spinner was faired-in for an AC current generator, and higher weight set of Baron wings and spars were used to handle the  fuel load.

Variants

Model 33 Debonair/Bonanza

 35-33 Debonair
(1959) Based on Bonanza with conventional fin and tailplane, and basic trim and interior, powered by one  Continental IO-470-J, 233 built.
 35-A33 Debonair
(1961) Fitted with improved interior trim, and powered by IO-470J or IO-470K. 154 built.
 B33 Debonair
(1961-1965) Further refined version, with new instrument panel, contoured fin leading edge and fuel tank modifications (as per N35 Bonanza). IO-470K engine. 426 built.
 C33 Debonair
(1965-1967) Higher gross weight and provision for enlarged rear windows. 304 built.
 C33A Debonair
(1966-1967) Powered by  Continental IO-520-B engine. 179 built.
 D33 
 One S35 modified as a military close-support prototype, with conventional tail assembly and six underwing hardpoints.
 E33 Bonanza
(1968-1969) Powered by  IO-470K. 116 built.
 E33A Bonanza
(1968-1969) E33 with a 285 hp Continental IO-520-B engine, 85 built.
 E33B Bonanza
 E33 with strengthened airframe and certified for aerobatics. Unbuilt.
 E33C Bonanza
(1968-1969) E33B with a 285 hp Continental IO-520-B engine, 25 built.
 F33 Bonanza
(1970) E33 with modified rear side windows and minor improvements, 20 built
 F33A Bonanza
(1970-1994) F33 with a 285 hp Continental IO-520-B engine, later aircraft have a longer S35/V35 cabin and extra seats, 1502 built.

 F33C Bonanza
(1970 onwards) F33A certified for aerobatics, 154 built on special order up to 1987
 G33 Bonanza
(1972-1973) F33 with a  Continental IO-470-N engine and V35B trim, 50 built.

Model 35 Bonanza
35
(1947–1948), initial production version with  Continental E-185 or E-185-1 engine, 1500 built.
A35
(1949) Model 35 with higher takeoff weight, tubular wing spars and nosewheel steering, 701 built.
 B35
(1950) A35 with a Continental E-185-8 engine, 480 built.
 C35
(1950-1952) B35 with a 185hp Continental E-185-11 engine, metal propeller, larger tail surfaces, and higher takeoff weight, approved for the Lycoming GO-435-D1 engine, 719 built.
 D35
(1953) C35 with increased takeoff weight and minor changes, approved for the Lycoming GO-435-D1 engine.  298 built. 
 E35
(1954) Powered by E-185-11 or  Continental E-225-8 engine, 301 built.
 F35
(1955) Powered by E-185-11 or E-225-8 engine. Extra rear window each side, strengthened wing leading edges and tail spar caps. 392 built.
 G35
(1956) Powered by Continental E-225-8 engine, thicker windshield. 476 built.
 H35

(1957) Powered by a  Continental O-470-G engine, and with modified structure. 464 built.
 J35
(1958) Powered by a  fuel injected Continental IO-470-C engine. 396 built.
 K35
(1959) Increased fuel load, optional fifth seat and increased takeoff weight, 436 built.
 M35
(1960) Similar to K35, 400 built.

 N35
(1961) Powered by a  Continental IO-470-N engine, increased fuel capacity, increased takeoff weight, and larger rear side windows, 280 built.
 O35
(1961) Experimental version fitted with laminar flow airfoil. Only one built.
 P35
(1962–1963) New instrument panel. 467 built.
 S35
(1964–1966) Powered by Continental IO-520-B engine, higher takeoff weight, longer cabin interior, optional fifth and sixth seat  and new rear window, 667 built.
 V35
(1966–1967) Fitted with single-piece windshield, powered by IO-520-B or optional  turbocharged TSIO-520-D engine (as V35-TC). 873 built, including 79 V35-TCs.
V35A
(1968–1969) Fitted with revised windshield, powered by IO-520-B or by optional turbocharged TSIO-520-D engine (as V35A-TC), 470 built, including 46 V35A-TCs.
V35B
(1970–1982) Initially with minor improvements over V35A, but had major internal redesign in 1972, and 24-volt electrical system in 1978. Normally powered by IO-520B, but available with optional TSIO-520-D (as V35TC) until 1971. 1335 built, including 7 V35TCs.

Model 36 Bonanza

36
(1968–1969) Revised utility aircraft with similar tail to Model 33 with a  fuselage stretch, four cabin windows each side, starboard rear double doors and seats for six, one 285 hp Continental IO-520-B engine, 184 built.
A36
(1970–2005) Model 36 with improved deluxe interior, a new fuel system, higher takeoff weight, from 1984 fitted with a Continental IO-550-BB engine and redesigned instrument panel and controls, 2128 built
A36TC
(1979–1981) Model 36 with a three-bladed propeller and a 300 hp turbocharged Continental TSIO-520-UB engine, 280 built
T36TC
(1979) A36 fitted with T-tail and a 325 hp Continental TSIO-520 engine, one built
B36TC
(1982–2002) A36TC with longer span wing, increased range, redesigned instrument panel and controls, higher takeoff weight, 116 built
 G36
(2006–present) – glass cockpit update of the A36 with the Garmin G1000 system

QU-22
YQU-22A (Model P.1079)
USAF military designation for a prototype intelligence-gathering drone version of the Bonanza 36, six built
YAU-22A (Model PD.249)
Prototype low-cost close-support version using Bonanza A36 fuselage and Baron B55 wings, one built
QU-22B
Production drone model for the USAF operation Pave Eagle, 27 built, modified with turbocharging, three-bladed propeller, and tip-tanks

Modifications
Allison Turbine Bonanza
Allison, in conjunction with Soloy Aviation Solutions, certified a conversion of Beech A36 Bonanza aircraft to be powered by an Allison 250-B17C turboprop engine.
Continental Voyager Bonanza (A36)
Standard aircraft with a liquid-cooled Continental Motors TSIOL-550-B engine.
Propjet Bonanza (A36)
standard aircraft modified by Tradewind Turbines with an Allison 250-B17F/2 turboprop engine (Original STC # 3523NM by Soloy).
TurbineAir Bonanza (B36TC)
Modification by Rocket Engineering subsidiary West Pacific Air, LLC with a 500 hp Pratt & Whitney PT6A-21 turboprop engine and  fuel capacity.
Whirlwind System II Turbonormalized Bonanza (36, A36, G36)
standard aircraft modified by Tornado Alley Turbo with a Tornado Alley Turbonormalizing (keeps power up to 20,000ft) system and approved for a 4000 lb MTOW
Whirlwind TCP Bonanza (A36TC or B36TC)
standard aircraft modified by Tornado Alley Turbo with a TCM IO-550B engine and Tornado Alley Turbonormalizing system, this airframe is approved for a 4042 lb MTOW.
Bay Super V
A multi-engine conversion of the C35 Bonanza.
Model 40
The Beechcraft Model 40A was an experimental twin-engined aircraft based on the Bonanza.  Only one prototype was built in 1948.  It featured a unique over/under arrangement of two 180-hp Franklin engines mounted on top of each other and driving a single propeller.  The plane had a different engine cowl from a standard Bonanza, and the nose gear could not fully retract, but otherwise it greatly resembled the production Bonanzas of the time. Certification rules demanded a firewall be fitted between the two engines, however, thus stopping development. The status of the prototype is unknown.
Parastu 14
This is the standard F33 (1970) variant of the Bonanza which has been reverse engineered by Defense Industries Organization of Iran  and is being manufactured without a license.

Operators

Civil

The Bonanza is popular with air charter companies, and is operated by private individuals and companies.

In 1949, Turner Airlines (later renamed Lake Central Airlines) commenced operations using three V-tail Bonanzas. That same year,
Central Airlines began operations using eight Bonanzas, later adding three more to the fleet before starting to phase them out in 1950 in favor of the Douglas DC-3.

Military

Haitian Air Corps – 1 x Bonanza F33
 
Indonesian Naval Aviation – 4 x Bonanza G36

Imperial Iranian Air Force – 10 x Bonanza F33A and 39 x Bonanza F33C

Israeli Air Force - Bonanza A-36 called Hofit.

Ivory Coast Air Force – 1 x Bonanza F33C

Mexican Air Force – 10 x Bonanza F33C

Netherlands Government Flying School – 16 x Bonanza F33C

National Guard – 1 x Bonanaza A35

Portuguese Air Force – 1 × Bonanza A35 operated 1949–55.

Spanish Air Force – 29 x Bonanza F33C and 25 x Bonanza F33A

Royal Thai Navy – 3 x Beech 35 Bonanza

United States Air Force - QU-22Bs.

Notable flights
 In January 1949, the fourth Bonanza to come off the production line was piloted by Captain William Odom from Honolulu, Hawaii, to the continental United States (2,900 statute miles), the first light airplane to do so.  The airplane was called Waikiki Beech, and its 40-gallon (150 L) fuel capacity was increased (using fuselage and wing tanks) to 268 gallons (1010 L), which gave a still-air range of nearly 5,000 statute miles.
After that flight, the airplane was donated to the Smithsonian Institution's National Air Museum, as the National Air and Space Museum was then called.
 On October 7, 1951, an American congressman from Illinois, Peter F. Mack, Jr., began an around-the-world trip in Waikiki Beech, on loan from the museum and reconditioned at the Beech factory, and renamed Friendship Flame.  He spent 15 weeks traveling through 30 countries (223 hours flight time).  The plane was again refurbished in 1975 and returned to the National Air and Space Museum.  It is still on display there, with both names painted on its sides.
 On May 31, 2014, 19-year-old MIT student Matt Guthmiller from Aberdeen, South Dakota, departed Gillespie Field in El Cajon, California, in a 1981 A36 Bonanza on a 44-day-12-hour solo circumnavigation, making him the Guinness World Record holder as the youngest person to fly solo around the world when he landed back in El Cajon on July 14, 2014, at 19 years, 7 months, and 15 days of age.

Accidents and incidents
There have been numerous accidents and incidents involving the Beechcraft Bonanza. Listed below are a select few of the most notable ones.

 On October 28, 1947, Oregon Governor Earl Snell, Oregon Secretary of State Robert S. Farrell, Jr., and State Senate President Marshall E. Cornett were killed along with pilot Cliff Hogue when their Bonanza 35 crashed in stormy weather southwest of Dog Lake in Lake County, Oregon.
 On January 26, 1952, Zubeida Begum and Hanwant Singh, Maharaja of Jodhpur,  died when their Beechcraft Bonanza crashed in Godwar (Rajasthan), India. Hanwant Singh was overworked while campaigning for elections and is reported to have been sleeping only four hours a night. The wreckage from this crash was discovered in storage in the cellar of the Central Jail in Jodhpur in 2011.
 On July 31, 1955, the rising Hollywood star Robert Francis died with two others when the Bonanza he was piloting crashed immediately after take-off from Burbank Airport.
 On February 3, 1959, rock and roll stars Buddy Holly, Ritchie Valens, and The Big Bopper, as well as pilot Roger Peterson, died when their Beechcraft Bonanza 35, registration N3794N, crashed shortly after takeoff at night in poor weather. The accident in northern Iowa later became known as "The Day the Music Died", after Don McLean referred to it by that name in his song "American Pie".
 On July 31, 1964, country music star Jim Reeves and his pianist Dean Manuel died when the Beechcraft Debonair N8972M Reeves was piloting crashed in the Brentwood area of Nashville during a violent thunderstorm.
 On February 14, 1975, Congressman Jerry Pettis was killed when the Beechcraft Model V35B Bonanza he was piloting crashed near Cherry Valley, California, after he encountered adverse weather conditions. The Jerry Pettis Memorial Veterans Administration Hospital in Loma Linda, California, is named in his honor.
 On February 7, 1981, Apple Computer cofounder Steve Wozniak crashed his Beechcraft Bonanza while taking off from Santa Cruz Sky Park. The NTSB investigation revealed Wozniak did not have a "high performance" endorsement (meaning he was not legally qualified to operate the airplane) and had a "lack of familiarity with the aircraft." The cause of the crash was determined to be a premature liftoff, followed by a stall and "mush" into a 12-foot embankment. Wozniak later made a full recovery, albeit with a case of temporary anterograde amnesia.
 On March 19, 1982, Ozzy Osbourne's guitarist Randy Rhoads was killed when the wing of the Bonanza F35 in which he was riding hit the band's tour bus then crashed into a tree and a nearby residence. Both of the other people on the aircraft, pilot Andrew Aycock and Osbourne's makeup artist Rachel Youngblood, also died in the crash. The NTSB cited the causes of the crash as poor judgement, buzzing, and misjudged clearance, as well as indicating that the use of the aircraft was not authorized by the aircraft's owner.
 On March January 14, 1996, Armenian-Turkish musician Onno Tunç died when a private Bonanza crashed in bad weather on a mountain at Tazdağ near Selimiye village of Armutlu, Yalova on his journey from Bursa to Istanbul.
 On March 13, 2006, game show host Peter Tomarken crashed his Bonanza A36 into Santa Monica Bay while climbing from Santa Monica Airport in California. He was en route to San Diego to pick up a cancer patient who needed transportation to UCLA Medical Center for treatment. Tomarken and his wife were killed in the crash.
 On July 23, 2014, Haris Suleman, a Pakistani-American pilot attempting to fly around the world in 30 days to promote education, crashed his Beechcraft Bonanza in the Pacific Ocean, killing him and leaving his father Babar Suleman, also on board, missing.

Specifications (2011 model G36)

See also

References
 Notes

 Bibliography

External links

 The history of the development of the Bonanza
 History of the V-tail safety issue 
 AVweb review of the Beechcraft 36 Bonanza

Bonanza
Low-wing aircraft
Single-engined tractor aircraft
1940s United States civil utility aircraft
V-tail aircraft
Aircraft first flown in 1945